The black-headed gull (Chroicocephalus ridibundus) is a small gull that breeds in much of  the Palearctic including Europe and also in coastal eastern Canada. Most of the population is migratory and winters further south, but some birds reside in the milder westernmost areas of Europe. Small numbers also occur in northeastern North America, where it was formerly known as the common black-headed gull. As is the case with many gulls, it was previously placed in the genus Larus.

The genus name  Chroicocephalus is from Ancient Greek khroizo, "to colour", and kephale, "head". The specific ridibundus is Latin for "laughing", from ridere "to laugh".

The black-headed gull displays a variety of compelling behaviours and adaptations. Some of these include removing eggshells from one's nest after hatching, begging co-ordination between siblings, differences between sexes, conspecific brood parasitism, and extra-pair paternity. They are an overwintering species, found in a variety of different habitats.

Description

In flight, the white leading edge to the wing is a good field mark. The summer adult has a chocolate-brown head (not black, although does look black from a distance), pale grey body, black tips to the primary wing feathers, and red bill and legs. The hood is lost in winter, leaving just two dark spots. Immature birds have a mottled pattern of brown spots over most of the body, and a black band on the tail. There is no difference in plumage between the sexes. 

It breeds in colonies in large reed beds or marshes, or on islands in lakes, nesting on the ground. Like most gulls, it is highly gregarious in winter, both when feeding or in evening roosts. It is not a pelagic species and is rarely seen at sea far from coasts.

The black-headed gull is a bold and opportunistic feeder. It eats insects, fish, seeds, worms, scraps, and carrion in towns, or invertebrates in ploughed fields with equal relish. It is a noisy species, especially in colonies, with a familiar "kree-ar" call. Its scientific name means laughing gull.

This species takes two years to reach maturity. First-year birds have a black terminal tail band, more dark areas in the wings, and, in summer, a less fully developed dark hood. Like most gulls, black-headed gulls are long-lived birds, with a maximum age of at least 32.9 years recorded in the wild, in addition to an anecdote now believed of dubious authenticity regarding a 63-year-old bird.

Distribution
Black-headed gulls can be found over much of Europe. It is also found in across the Palearctic to Japan and east China. Small numbers also breed in northeastern Canada and can be seen in winter in northeast North America as far south as Virginia, often with the similar-looking Bonaparte's Gull and also in some Caribbean islands.

Behaviour

Eggshell removal 
Eggshell removal is a behaviour seen in birds once the chicks have hatched, observed mostly to reduce risk of predation. Removing the eggshell acts as a way of camouflage to avoid predators seeing the nest. The further away egg shells are from the nest, the lower the predation risk. Black-headed gull eggs experience predation from different species of birds, foxes, stoats, and even other black-headed gulls. Although mothers show some form of aggressiveness when a predator is near, in the first 30 minutes, wet chicks can be easily taken by other black-headed gulls after hatching when the parents of the wet chick are distracted.

Black headed gulls also carry away other objects that do not belong in the nest. The removal of eggshells and other objects is important not only in the incubation period but also during the first few days after the eggs hatch. However, the removal process seems to increase as time goes on. The removal is done by both the male and female parents, normally lasts a few seconds and is done three times a year.

A black-headed gull is able to differentiate an egg shell from an egg by acknowledging its thin, serrated, white, edge. Therefore, the weight of the egg or eggshell does not play a role when determining its value.

Earlier eggshell removal hypotheses 
Other hypotheses have attempted to explain the survival value of black-headed gulls removing their eggshells from the nest, including:

 The sharp edges of the shells after hatching could harm the chicks
 The eggshell could somehow intrude during the brooding
 The eggshell could slip over the unhatched egg, creating a double shell
 Some of the moist organic material left from the shell could lead to a production of bacteria and mould

Breeding

Begging coordination between siblings 
Black-headed gulls feed their young by regurgitating onto the ground, rather than into each chick one at a time. The parents tend to accommodate their regurgitation amounts for how intense the nest begging is, from both an individual chick or a group of chicks begging together. Chicks who are siblings, have learned this behaviour and begin synchronizing their begging signals to decrease the costs as an individual and increase the benefits as a whole. The rate of parental food regurgitation to chicks increases with begging intensity.

The amount and response of begging signals differs throughout the nestling period. Usually, there are 3-5 begging events/hour, each lasting around one minute. High intensity begging behaviour appears at the end of the first week in the nest, but the coordination between multiple chicks emerge during the last week of the nestling period. The more siblings present, the more they coordinate their begging while decreasing the number of begging.

Sex differences 
Male chicks have less of a chance of survival when compared to female chicks. Black-headed gulls are a sexually size-dimorphic species, so the larger sex is at a disadvantage when the amount of food sources are low.

Male birds are more likely to be born in the first egg and female birds are more likely to be born in the third. The position of a female black-headed gull in response to the food available when laying the eggs can predict the offspring's characteristics.

Conspecific brood parasitism 
Conspecific brood parasitism is a behaviour that occurs when females lay their eggs in another female’s nest, of the same species. It can reduce the cost of incubation and nestling young by passing it on to another bird. Black-headed gulls usually lay three egg clutches, and the first two are normally larger than the third. The third egg normally has the lowest survival rate, while the first or second are usually the parasitic eggs.

Most of the egg dumping occurs within the beginning of the egg laying period. The parasitic eggs being laid in another conspecific’s nest increases the chance of hatching and may occur because of nest desertion or a nest being taken over by another bird.

Multiple eggs in a nest from different mothers may also result from intra-specific nest parasitism, joint female nesting, and nest takeover. Intra-specific nest parasitism is a disadvantage to the hosts because the female could end up taking care of the parasitic chicks over her own and therefore neglecting them and reducing their fitness. Another disadvantage for the host is that incubating more chicks than their own takes up more energy.

Extra-pair paternity 
The rate of extra-pair paternity (EPP) has a large variation between populations of black-headed gulls. It is primarily a context-dependent strategy, meaning not all black headed gulls experience this behaviour. The variation between populations of extra-pair paternity can be explained by the variation it has on the advantages and disadvantages it has on a female, as well, as the variation in pressure on a females choice.

The differences in the rate of EPP may be determined by multiple different factors: life history traits, ecological factors or different behavioural strategies of males.

Central–periphery gradient within colonies 
Egg-laying can be earlier in Black-headed Gulls nesting in the centre of the colony, with central pairs tending to lay larger eggs, which have a higher hatching success, than pairs nesting at the periphery of the colony. Centrally nesting individuals have also been found to be in better condition and have higher genetic quality.

Walking displays 
Black-headed gulls display both head-bobbing walking (HBW) and non-bobbing walking (NBW). Head-bobbing walking is expressed by a hold phase and a thrust phase. The hold phase in black-headed gulls occurs mainly during the single support phase and is when the bird balances its head to equal the environment. Head-bobbing walking occurs during a seeking type foraging by walking through water and includes benefits such as enhancing motion and pattern detection and gathering depth information from motion parallax during the thrust phase. Non-bobbing walking occurs when black-headed gulls are displaying a waiting behaviour while foraging on flat surfaces.

Uses

The eggs of the black-headed gull are considered a delicacy by some in the UK and are eaten hard boiled. The collection of black-headed gull eggs is heavily regulated by the UK government. Eggs may only be taken by a small number of licensed individuals at six sites between April 1 and May 15 each year and only a single egg may be taken from each nest. No eggs are permitted to be sold after June 30. As the gulls tend to lay in late April and early May, the eggs are only available to purchase for 3 or 4 weeks per year.

Synchronization
Observations on the behavior of black-headed gulls show that black-headed gulls individuals synchronize their vigilance activity with other black-headed gulls neighbors. Synchronization in black-headed gulls groups is dependent on the distance between the black-headed gulls members.

Australian discovery
On 19th October 1991, local Broome birder Brian Kane saw a strange species of bird while trawling the local sewer ponds. Upon seeing this bird, he contacted the Broome Bird Observatory by telephone to verify the species, however there was conjecture regarding its identity.  Kane took photos of the bird and recorded field notes, before sending this information to the Appraisals Committee in Hobart, Tasmania, who were able to confirm that it was indeed a black-headed gull. This was the first recorded sighting of the species in Australia.

In popular culture
In Richard Adams' 1972 novel Watership Down, a black-headed gull named Kehaar (who claims his name is the onomatopoeia of waves breaking against the shore) plays a major part in the story. Injured by a farm cat and left behind during the seasonal migrations, Kehaar finds himself stranded on the Downs and is taken in by a warren of European rabbits. He later becomes their friend and ally, and helps to save the rabbits from danger many times; instincts eventually force him to return to his colony, but he promises to visit the rabbits each winter.    True to Adams' stated intentions of trying to keep the animals' behavior close to reality, Kehaar is characterized as intelligent, gregarious, noisy, messy, and impatient. He has a guttural accent, inspired by a Norwegian Resistance fighter Adams once had known. Kehaar appears in all three screen adaptations of the novel; the character was voiced by Zero Mostel in the 1978 film, Rik Mayall in the 1999 TV series, and Peter Capaldi in the 2018 miniseries.

The black-headed gull is the official bird of Tokyo, Japan, and the Yurikamome automated guideway transit in Tokyo Bay is named after it.

Gallery

References

External links

 Black-headed gull stamps from many countries at bird-stamps.org
 Ageing and sexing (PDF; 2.0 MB) by Javier Blasco-Zumeta & Gerd-Michael Heinze
 Feathers of Black-headed Gull (Larus ridibundus) at Ornithos.de
 
 
 
 
 
 
 
 
 Article with video about Black-Headed Gull at avibirds.com

black-headed gull
black-headed gull
Birds of Africa
Birds of Japan
Holarctic birds
Taxa named by Carl Linnaeus
Taxobox binomials not recognized by IUCN